Retirement Farm, also known as the James M. Vandergrift Farm, is a historic home and farm located near Odessa, New Castle County, Delaware.  It was built in the late-19th century, and is a -story, five-bay frame, gable roofed farmhouse with a two-story rear ell. Also on the property are a small barn (c. 1800),  granary (c. 1850), and barn (c. 1900).  The small barn is the last known example of its kind surviving in St. Georges Hundred.

It was listed on the National Register of Historic Places in 1985.

References

External links

Houses on the National Register of Historic Places in Delaware
Barns on the National Register of Historic Places in Delaware
Houses in New Castle County, Delaware
Historic American Buildings Survey in Delaware
National Register of Historic Places in New Castle County, Delaware